Belmont-Broye is a municipality in the district of Broye, in the canton of Fribourg, Switzerland.  On 1 January 2016, the former municipalities of Domdidier, Dompierre, Léchelles and Russy merged to form Belmont-Broye.

History
Domdidier is first mentioned around 1157-62 as Donno Desiderio.

Dompierre is first mentioned in 1137 as Donperre.

Léchelles is first mentioned in 1243 as Leschieres.  The municipality was formerly known by its German name Leitern, however, that name is no longer used.

Russy is first mentioned in 1228 as Rusie.

Geography

Demographics

Heritage sites of national significance

The Mansion De Gottrau is listed as a Swiss heritage site of national significance.  The entire village of Dompierre is designated as part of the Inventory of Swiss Heritage Sites.

Transportation

References

External links

 
 
 
 
 

Municipalities of the canton of Fribourg
Populated places established in 2016